Protea lepidocarpodendron, the black bearded sugarbush, is a bearded Protea that is placed in the section Speciosae. It grows between one and 2 m tall, with narrowly oblong leaves. Flowerheads are oblong with a purple-black beard and black hairs below the beard. It typically grows in sandstone, fericrete and granite soils in the Western Cape from Cape Town to Kleinmond. It is near-threatened.

References

External links

lepidocarpodendron
Flora of the Cape Provinces
Plants described in 1771
Taxa named by Carl Linnaeus